Roland Meledandri (died 1980) was an American fashion designer who specialised in designing menswear. Meledandri founded his clothing store, named Meledandri after himself, in 1961. Meledandri hired unemployed actors to work as salespeople, dressing them in his own products to attract customers. He disliked the conservative nature of men's fashion at the time, and sold suits that were more closely fitting, with dark-patterned shirts and wider ties than was the norm at the time. The shop was noted for being frequented by a wide range of politicians and celebrities. Meledandri died on July 19, 1980, of a heart attack. His son is Chris Meledandri, head of Illumination.

References

Menswear designers
American fashion designers
1980 deaths